Murad Fatiyev (born 2 April 1999) is an Azerbaijani judoka.

He is the bronze medallist at the 2021 Judo Grand Slam Tbilisi and is scheduled to represent Azerbaijan at the 2020 Summer Olympics.

References

External links
 
 

1999 births
Living people
Azerbaijani male judoka
Judoka at the 2020 Summer Olympics
Olympic judoka of Azerbaijan
20th-century Azerbaijani people
21st-century Azerbaijani people